Euskotren Tranbia is the brand under which the tramway networks in the cities of Vitoria-Gasteiz and Bilbao (both in the Basque Country, Spain) are run. The system in Bilbao started operations in 2002, and the one in Vitoria-Gasteiz in 2008. It is one of the four commercial divisions under which Euskotren (a public company managed by the Basque Government) operates. The infrastructure is owned by the public entity Euskal Trenbide Sarea (Basque Railway Network) and tracks use  narrow gauge.

Services 

Euskotren Tranbia operates tram networks in Vitoria-Gasteiz (province of Álava) and Bilbao (province of Biscay). The first network, then named EuskoTran started operations in Bilbao in 2002 after two years under construction, connecting Bilbao-Atxuri Station with Uribitarte. The line was eventually expanded to the Guggenheim Museum Bilbao, Basurto Hospital and finally La Casilla.

The tramway system in Vitoria-Gasteiz opened in 2008 and has a Y-shaped network, with two different lines that cross the city from south to north.

Trams run on the street (shared with other traffic or on dedicated tracks) and on grass tracks. It also shares dedicated lanes with the local bus services, TUVISA in Vitoria-Gasteiz and Bilbobus in Bilbao.

Stop design 

The two tram systems have their own, distinguishable stops, some of them shared with bus systems and with low platforms. The stops of Atxuri, Ribera and Abando, all of them in Bilbao, do not have a dedicated platform, they use the sidewalk. Except for Atxuri, all stops are unstaffed and rely on automated ticket machines. All the stations have displays and screens with the network map, the current time and temperature and the frequencies. Due to the low platforms, the access between them involves crossing the tracks by pedestrian level crossing. This allows wheelchairs, prams, pushchairs and the elderly to board the tram easily with no steps. In street sections, the pavement is integrated with the tram stop. The system in Bilbao has 14 stops, while the one in Vitoria has 23.

Systems

Bilbao

Vitoria-Gasteiz

Fares and ticketing 

The two systems use both regular paper tickets and smartcards (BAT, Barik and Mugi). There are single, daily and monthly tickets available. In both networks, ticket pricing is not based on zone-based rules, as there's a unique fare for the whole of each network.

Rolling stock 
Euskotren Tranbia operates a fleet of 26 CAF Urbos trams, distributed between both networks.

Current fleet 

The 400 series consists of 8 vehicles (numbered 401-408), built for the Bilbao network. Each tram can carry 196 passengers. They are the only CAF Urbos 1 trams to have been built.

The 500 series consists of 11 vehicles (numbered 501-511), originally built for the Vitoria-Gasteiz network. Each tram can carry 261 passengers. Due to the introduction of the larger 600 series in Vitoria-Gasteiz, three vehicles will be transferred to Bilbao.

The 600 series consists of 7 vehicles (numbered 601-607), built for the Vitoria-Gasteiz network. Each tram can carry 398 passengers.

Livery 

The trams were originally painted in grey and green stripes, the colours of Euskotren Tranbia. The current livery is white and green.

Planned developments

Bilbao

Vitoria-Gasteiz

Shelved projects

Barakaldo tram 

There were plans to create a tram network in the municipality of Barakaldo, in the Greater Bilbao area, which would have started in Urbinaga (where it would have been connected to the Leioa tram) and from there create a circular line around the city center. The project included fifteen stops within Barakaldo plus two in Sestao, where it would connect with the Leioa line. Even if this project hasn't been officially canceled, no progress has been made since 2010.

Leioa tram 

The construction of a tramway for the municipality of Leioa, in the Greater Bilbao area had two phases. The first phase consisted in the construction of the depot and offices. The second phase would have involved the line itself including the rail track and stops from the University of the Basque Country campus to downtown Leioa. It would have included nine stops. A third phase would have made the tramway cross the Estuary of Bilbao and connect Leioa with the Left Bank with two extra stations.

Only the first phase (the depot and offices) has been built. After being postponed several times, the project was shelved in 2018.

See also 

 Euskotren Trena

Notes

References

External links 

Euskotren
Tram transport in Spain
Rail transport in the Basque Country (autonomous community)
Transport in Bilbao
Metre gauge railways in Spain
Spanish brands